Maria Therese von Wüllenweber (19 February 1833 – 25 December 1907) was a German Roman Catholic religious sister. She established the Sisters of the Divine Savior – also referred to as the Salvatorian Sisters – with the assistance of the priest Francis Mary of the Cross Jordan, founder of the Salvatorians. She later assumed the name Maria of the Apostles following her perpetual vows.

She was beatified on 13 October 1968 after Pope Paul VI recognized two miracles attributed to her intercession.

Life
Maria Therese von Wüllenweber was born in 1833 as the eldest of five daughters to Baron Theodore von Wüllenweber. She was a spiritual child and felt drawn to religious life with a desire to join the missions. The Benedictines of Liège in Belgium as well as private tutors oversaw her education until the age of fifteen. She also desired to learn the Italian language.

She entered the convent at the age of 24 in Blumenthal - against the wishes of her father but with the assent of her mother - and lived in the convents in Warendort and later in Orléans in France. She soon realized her vocation was not as that of a teacher and left religious life in March 1863 to return home where she cultivated a devotion to the Sacred Heart. She was later involved for a brief period with the Sisters of the Visitation but it was not until 1868 that she became a member of the Congregation of Perpetual Adoration in Brussels. It was there that she began to work with the poor. Throughout her travels, she also met Arnold Janssen.

In 1870 she returned home after a long period of work where she met Johann Baptist Jordan in mid-1882. With him she established the Sisters of the Divine Savior on 8 December 1888 as the new order's first superior in Tivoli.

She died on Christmas in 1907 in Rome.

Beatification
The beatification process commenced on 1 March 1955 under Pope Pius XII but the cause had commenced in Rome in a diocesan process prior to this, spanning from 1943 until 1949. The second process opened in 1955 after the formal introduction of the cause and concluded its business in 1957; the introduction of the cause granted her the posthumous title Servant of God. Both processes were ratified in 1959 in order for the cause to proceed to the next stage.

She was declared to be Venerable on 15 July 1965 after Pope Paul VI recognized her life of heroic virtue. He approved two miracles attributed to her intercession in mid-1968 and beatified her on 13 October 1968 in Saint Peter's Basilica, conferring the title of Blessed upon her.

References

External links
Hagiography Circle
Saints SQPN
Salvatorian Sisters

1833 births
1907 deaths
19th-century venerated Christians
20th-century venerated Christians
German beatified people
Founders of Catholic religious communities
People from Düsseldorf